Graneros Department is a department located in the southeast of the Tucumán Province, Argentina. At the 2001 census, the department had a population of 13,063, making it the least populated department in the province. The town of Graneros is the department’s seat.

Geography
Graneros has a total area of 1,678 km². Two rivers, Marapa and San Francisco, flow across the department and empty in the Rio Hondo Lake in the northeast end. There are hot springs in the Taco Ralo area.

Adjacent departments
Simoca Department – north
Juan Bautista Alberdi Department – west
La Cocha Department – west

It also borders the provinces of Santiago del Estero in the east and Catamarca in the south.

Towns and communities

Árboles Grandes
Graneros
La Cañada
Lamadrid
Sol de Mayo
Taco Ralo

Transportation infrastructure

Major highways
National Route 157
Tucuman Province Routes: 308 and 334.

Departments of Tucumán Province